Otto III (11 February 1261 – 9 November 1312), a member of the Wittelsbach dynasty, was the Duke of Lower Bavaria from 1290 to 1312 and the King of Hungary and Croatia between 1305 and 1307. His reign in Hungary was disputed by Charles Robert of the Angevin dynasty.

Family
Otto was born in Burghausen, the son of Henry XIII, Duke of Bavaria, and Elizabeth of Hungary.

Biography
Otto succeeded his father in 1290 as duke of Lower Bavaria, together with his younger brothers, Louis III and Stephen I. He was in opposition to Habsburg and tried to regain Styria which Bavaria had lost in 1180. Otto supported Adolf, King of Germany against Habsburg and fought on his side in the Battle of Göllheim. The Hungarian crown was offered to Otto, a grandson of Béla IV of Hungary, in 1301 but he did not accept before 1305.

In August 1305, his opponent, Wenceslaus III of Bohemia, who had inherited Bohemia from his father, renounced his claim to Hungary on behalf of Otto III. Since the Habsburg Albert I of Germany was blocking the way through Austria, Otto disguised himself as a merchant, and reached Buda in November 1305.

He was then crowned with the Holy Crown of Hungary in Székesfehérvár by the Bishops of Veszprém and Csanád on 6 December. However, Otto was not able to strengthen his rule. In the course of 1306, Otto's second opponent Charles of Anjou occupied Esztergom, Szepes Castle, Zólyom and some other fortresses in the northern parts of the kingdom, and in the next year he also occupied Buda. In June 1307, Duke Otto III visited the powerful Voivode of Transylvania, Ladislaus Kán, but the latter imprisoned him. On 10 October 1307, the magnates presented at the assembly in Rákos proclaimed Charles king, but the most powerful aristocrats (Matthew III Csák, Amadé Aba and Ladislaus Kán) ignored him as well. At the end of the year, Ladislaus Kán set Otto free who then left the country, but the Voivode of Transylvania still denied to hand over the Holy Crown of Hungary to Charles, whose legitimacy could be questioned without the coronation with the Holy Crown.

Otto abdicated the Hungarian throne in 1308. Otto's involvement in Austrian and Hungarian affairs weakened his position in Bavaria and finally led to failure due to financial problems. In Hungarian historiography he is noted as an anti-king during the interregnum of 1301–1310.

During his presence in Hungary 1305–1308 Lower Bavaria was ruled by his brother Stephen I. In 1310 a new war against Habsburg devastated Burghausen. Otto died in 1312 and was succeeded in Lower Bavaria by his son Henry XV, who shared power with his cousins, Henry XIV and Otto IV, both sons of Stephen I. John I, a son of Henry XIV, was the last duke of Lower Bavaria before Louis IV, Holy Roman Emperor inherited the country and reunited the duchy in 1340.

Marriages and children

In January, 1279, Otto married Catherine, a daughter of Rudolf I of Germany and Gertrude of Hohenberg. Their twins, Henry and Rudolph, were born in 1280 and died the same year.

Catharine died on 4 April 1282. Otto remained a widower for twenty-three years. On 18 May 1309, Otto married his second wife Agnes of Glogau. She was a daughter of Henry III, Duke of Silesia-Glogau, and Matilda of Brunswick-Lüneburg. They had two children:

Agnes of Wittelsbach (1310–1360).
Henry XV, Duke of Bavaria (28 August 1312 – 18 June 1333).

Otto died in Landshut.

Ancestors

References

External links
 Historisches Lexikon Bayerns: Ungarisches Königtum Ottos III. von Niederbayern, 1305–1307 (Sarah Hadry)

A listing of descendants of Otto I, Count of Scheyern, including Henry XIII and his children
Life Synopsis of Ottokar III Duke of Bavaria and his short rule as King of Hungary

|-

1261 births
1312 deaths
13th-century dukes of Bavaria
14th-century dukes of Bavaria
Kings of Hungary
House of Wittelsbach